Artemis Crock is a fictional comic book character, appearing in American comic books published by DC Comics. First appearing in Infinity, Inc. #34 (January 1987), she has appeared as both a supervillain and superhero, usually using her first name as her alias. Artemis is also one of many characters to use the name Tigress. In addition, she is also the daughter of Sportsmaster and Paula Brooks.

Outside of comic books, Artemis has appeared in Young Justice, voiced by Stephanie Lemelin, and Stargirl, portrayed by Stella Smith. Additionally, a character inspired by Artemis named Evelyn Sharp appears in Arrow, portrayed by Madison McLaughlin.

Publication history
Artemis Crock debuted in Infinity, Inc. #34 (January 1987) and was created by writer Roy Thomas and artist Todd McFarlane.

Fictional character biography
Artemis Crock is the daughter of the Golden Age villains Paula Brooks and Crusher Crock. She had taken up a career in crime, modeled after that of her parents, but only after some years did she take on the mantle of Tigress.

During the DC mini-series Legends, the people of America were turned against heroes, and law was made that no one could operate legally wearing a costume. This did not affect the villains much, as they were already breaking the law. For Artemis Crock it proved an opportune time to break her parents out of the Empire State Detention Center. Calling herself only Artemis she joined the Wizard in his new Injustice Society – which he called Injustice Unlimited. They overcame the security at the International Trade Conference in Calgary, Canada, namely Infinity, Inc. and a contingent of the Global Guardians and forced the heroes to help in some mayhem. For Artemis, she took Nuklon and Rising Sun to New York and, with their help, freed the elder felons. They all returned to Calgary to share in the stolen wealth but the plan went haywire when Hourman revived and freed himself, as well as when Solomon Grundy was brought in from the Arctic Circle. It was Solomon who incapacitated Artemis and her parents, but in the confusion they were able to escape.

Only weeks later Artemis again joined with the Icicle and Hazard, as well as the new Harlequin, the Dummy, and Solomon Grundy. The Dummy wanted to head a revived Injustice Unlimited and planned to murder the members of Infinity Inc. to make a name for themselves. Their first target - Skyman - was successfully killed by the Harlequin and then Artemis went after Jade. After believing her dead, Artemis returned to her cohorts. A plan was hatched to bring all the remaining Infinitors to Stellar Studios and kill them, a plan defeated only by the unwillingness of Hazard to cooperate, and the sudden reappearance of Jade and Brainwave Jr (both of whom had been thought dead). During the fight, Artemis went one-on-one with Wildcat and lost. In the end Artemis was given over to law enforcement.

Artemis later changed her codename to Tigress and became on-again, off-again lovers with the second Icicle. He invited her back into the reformation of the Injustice Society. She helped him, Wizard, Solomon Grundy, Gentleman Ghost, Rag Doll and Thinker break into JSA headquarters and steal the Prometheus Key, a key that is used to open doors between reality and magic. This allowed Johnny Sorrow who had asked the Wizard to bring him back, to re-enter the Earth.

During the Infinite Crisis storyline, Artemis appeared as a member of Alexander Luthor, Jr.'s Secret Society of Super Villains. She later appeared in the Justice League Wedding Special.

Icicle and Tigress later alternately work with and against Hourman and Liberty Belle in a quest to locate a magical artifact.

In 2010, Isabelle Rose Mahkent is born. She is the daughter of the Tigress and the Icicle.

The New 52
In The New 52 reboot of DC's continuity, a new version of Artemis was introduced in the "Culling" crossover in Teen Titans books. Here, she is a human with no powers, but has been trained to be a strong fighter. She helps the Teen Titans get their bearings before the Culling begins and introduces them to other meta-teens that Harvest has collected. After the Titans are taken, a member of Harvest's crew tries to put her in a state of rage. She fights back and refuses to kill other kids, but instead is killed. Her death helps motivate the Teen Titans and the Legion Lost to join to take down Harvest. At the end of the series, the Titans discover that Artemis was healed by the Colonel of Harvest's facility, as part of a second phase of Harvest's plans.

DC Rebirth
Artemis appeared in The Flash vol. 5, #61.

Powers and abilities
Tigress/Artemis possesses no superhuman abilities, however, she is an expert archer and marksman. Artemis is also a highly skilled in hand-to-hand combat, along with the use of various gadgets (including her compact crossbow, knives, nets, and bolas).

In other media

Television

 Artemis Crock makes a cameo appearance in the Batman: The Brave and the Bold episode "Aquaman's Outrageous Adventure!"
 A teenage version of Artemis Crock (full name Artemis Lian Crock) appears in Young Justice, voiced by Stephanie Lemelin. This version is half-Vietnamese, half-Caucasian. Introduced in the episode "Infiltrator", she is passed off as Green Arrow's niece and new sidekick and joins the Team following the departure of Green Arrow's original sidekick, Roy Harper. Later in the series however, the Team discovers her true history and connection to Sportsmaster, who had become an enemy of theirs, and becomes Wally West's girlfriend in the season one finale. In season two, she fakes her death so she can infiltrate the Light as the supervillain "Tigress". By the end of the second season, she returns to the Team while retaining her Tigress identity. As of season four, she has become a college professor and entered a relationship with Jason Bard.
 A character inspired by Artemis named Evelyn Crawford Sharp appears in Arrow, portrayed by Madison McLaughlin.
 Artemis Crock appears in Stargirl, portrayed by Stella Smith. This version is an athletic student at Blue Valley High and classmate of the titular character with a competitive streak. As of season two, she moves into a foster home following her parents, Sportsmaster and Tigress, being arrested and is secretly manipulated by Cindy Burman and Eclipso into joining their group Injustice Unlimited. After joining Burman, Eclipso, and Isaac Bowin in fighting Stargirl's Justice Society of America (JSA) however, Artemis flees after Eclipso sends Burman to the Shadowlands and consumes Bowin. She later breaks her parents out of prison so they can help the JSA and Burman defeat Eclipso. Following this, the Crocks move in next door to the Whitmore-Dugan family. In season three, Artemis works to prove herself as a candidate for JSA membership and later gets into college, only to lose her parents to Icicle and move in with the Whitmore-Dugans.

Film
 The Young Justice incarnation of Artemis makes a cameo appearance in Scooby-Doo! WrestleMania Mystery.
 The Young Justice incarnation of Artemis makes a cameo appearance in Teen Titans Go! To the Movies.
 In the 2014 film Sophia Grace & Rosie's Royal Adventure, the character of Princess Abigail (portrayed by Margaret Clunie) dresses up as the Young Justice incarnation of Artemis.

Video games
 The Young Justice incarnation of Artemis appears as a playable character in Young Justice: Legacy, voiced again by Stephanie Lemelin.
 Artemis Crock, in her heroine and Tigress forms, appear as separate playable characters in Lego DC Super Villains

References

External links
 Artemis Crock: The Complete History
 Comic Book Database: Tigress III
 Cosmic Team Profile
 Hawkman Villains Profile
 Tigress Rap Sheet
 The Unofficial Tigress III Biography 

Comics characters introduced in 1987
DC Comics sidekicks
DC Comics female superheroes
DC Comics female supervillains
DC Comics martial artists
Characters created by Roy Thomas
Characters created by Todd McFarlane
Vigilante characters in comics
Fictional archers
Fictional women soldiers and warriors
Fictional acrobats